Neil Ryan is an English football head coach for the England U18s and former player who played as a defender. He played professionally in the United States USL A-League.

The son of former footballer Jimmy Ryan, Neil started his early football career playing at Luton Town in 1991 he was a youth team player for two seasons and eventually turned professional in 1994. His professional contract with Luton ended in 1995 and he then moved to the United States and signed with the Richmond Kickers of the USISL Select League. He then moved through several teams in succession. In 1998, he signed with the Worcester Wildfire, but also played a few games on loan with the Cape Cod Crusaders of the USISL D-3 Pro League. In the fall of 1998, Ryan moved indoors with the Wichita Wings of the National Professional Soccer League. He spent two indoor seasons with the Wings. In 2001, Ryan finished his American career with the Portland Timbers.

In November that year, Ryan returned to England and joined Altrincham F.C. of the semi-professional Northern Premier League. He made his first appearance on 12 December 2001 in the Northern Premier League Challenge Cup. Ryan left Altrincham in September 2003. 

In July 2018, after 15 years working through the age groups of U11 to U16 within the Manchester United academy, Ryan was appointed as the head coach of the club's under-18 side.

On 13 May 2022, Ryan was appointed a national coach with England men's teams after 19 years at Manchester United. On 16 August 2022, it was confirmed that Ryan would take charge of the England U18s.

References

Living people
1975 births
English footballers
English expatriate footballers
National Professional Soccer League (1984–2001) players
Richmond Kickers players
Boston Bulldogs (soccer) players
Cape Cod Crusaders players
Wichita Wings (NPSL) players
Portland Timbers (2001–2010) players
Altrincham F.C. players
Trafford F.C. players
USISL Select League players
USL Second Division players
A-League (1995–2004) players
Association football defenders
Association football midfielders
English expatriate sportspeople in the United States
Expatriate soccer players in the United States
Association football coaches